Heidi See (née Gregson; born 9 August 1989) is an Australian middle-distance runner. She competed in the 1500 metres at the 2015 World Championships in Beijing without advancing from the first round. In September 2014, she married an American runner, Jeff See.

International competitions

Personal bests
Outdoor
1500 metres – 4:08.15 (Greenville 2015)
One mile – 4:34.05 (Raleigh 2014)
Indoor
One mile – 4:33.30 (Winston-Salem 2016)
3000 metres – 8:55.20 (Boston 2015)

References

External links
 

1989 births
Living people
Australian female middle-distance runners
World Athletics Championships athletes for Australia
Athletes from Sydney
20th-century Australian women
21st-century Australian women